Chattaniki Veyi Kallu is a 1983 Indian Telugu-language action drama film directed by Vijaya Nirmala starring Krishna Ghattamaneni, Jayasudha, Madhavi and Rao Gopala Rao. Krishna enacted dual roles of Pratap and Anand.

Cast 
 Krishna Ghattamaneni as Prathap Kumar & Anandh  (Dual Role)
 Jayasudha
 Madhavi
 Rao Gopala Rao
 Allu Ramalingaiah
 Giribabu
 Nutan Prasad
 Ravi Kondala Rao
 Tyagaraju
 Jayamalini
 Nirmala
 Rajanala as Rangaiah
 Kanta Rao as Raghunath
Mikkilineni

Music 
The film's soundtrack was scored and composed by Chakravarthy.
 "Kougili Isthe" - S. P. Balasubrahmanyam, S. Janaki
 "Enno Poddula" - S.P.B., P. Susheela
 "Kota Asalaa" - S.P.B.
 "Na Jilugupaita" - P. Susheela
 "Buchi Balra" - S.P.B., P. Susheela
 "Ide Naa Jeevitha" - P. Susheela

References

External links 

1983 films
1983 action films
Indian action films
Films scored by K. Chakravarthy
1980s Telugu-language films
Films directed by Vijaya Nirmala